Cheshunt Building Society was a UK building society, which merged with the Bristol and West Building Society on 30 December 1991. Bristol and West was taken over by the Bank of Ireland in 1997. Its savings balances and branch network transferred to the Britannia Building Society in 2005, which in turn merged with Co-operative Financial Services in 2009.

References

External links
Co-operative Financial Services website